Athmeeya Yathra (Spiritual Journey) is a Christian satellite channel and radio broadcast. The radio broadcast began in India in 1985. It is based in Thiruvalla, Kerala, India.

Origins
The program was first aired as a 15-minute daily broadcast by Dr. K. P. Yohannan, Metropolitan Bishop of the Believers Church. The programmes mainly deals with issues that people face on a day-to-day basis. The simple language attracted many and made it easy for everyone to understand.

As languages began to be added, Athmeeya Yathra Radio expanded in scope and reach. The programme is at present broadcast in 110 languages across Asia. The broadcasting is done through Short wave (SW), Medium Wave (MW) and FM stations. Broadcast languages include Sinhalese, Malayalam, Telugu, Kannada, Tamil, Oriya, Gujarati, Punjabi, Bengali, Assamese, Hindi, Rajasthani, Marwari, Marathi, Bhojpuri, Bundeli, Nepali, Chhattisgarhi, Urdu, and Santali.

Athmeeya Yathra was almost a household name in the Kerala when radio was the main medium. The radio broadcasts are now available online. It is available in Asianet Digital TV, channel number 111.

Athmeeya Yathra TV 
What started as a radio broadcast 30 years ago took a step forward in 2011 when Athmeeya Yathra Television was launched. The mission of this TV channel is to bring healing, hope and blessings to this generation through Christ's love. It is done through broadcasting value-based programs with the goal to work a positive difference in people's beliefs, behaviour and their relation to God and their fellow men.

Athmeeya Yathra Television is also streamed live on the internet.

References

1985 establishments in Kerala
1985 radio programme debuts
Indian radio programmes
Christian radio stations in Asia
Religious television channels in India
Christian television stations
Christian media in Kerala